The Potters Bar Old Baptist Church, as it is now known, is a former church in Hertfordshire, England.  It was designed by W. Allen Dixon in 1868. Dixon specialised in church architecture and Baptist churches in particular.

The church replaced an earlier Baptist Church of 1789. It was registered for worship by the Particular Baptists and extended in 1884. The church was damaged by a German V2 missile in 1945. The building is now used as a church hall and a new Baptist church has been built alongside.

References 

Buildings designed by W. Allen Dixon
Former churches in Hertfordshire
Potters Bar
Baptist churches in England